The 2005–06 Cypriot Fourth Division was the 21st season of the Cypriot fourth-level football league. Anagennisi Germasogeias won their 1st title.

Format
Fourteen teams participated in the 2005–06 Cypriot Fourth Division. All teams played against each other twice, once at their home and once away. The team with the most points at the end of the season crowned champions. The first three teams were promoted to the 2006–07 Cypriot Third Division and the last three teams were relegated to regional leagues.

Point system
Teams received three points for a win, one point for a draw and zero points for a loss.

Changes from previous season
Teams promoted to 2005–06 Cypriot Third Division
 Frenaros FC
 Digenis Oroklinis
 Atromitos Yeroskipou

Teams relegated from 2004–05 Cypriot Third Division
 Othellos Athienou
 Orfeas Nicosia
 AEK/Achilleas Ayiou Theraponta1

1AEK/Achilleas Ayiou Theraponta withdrew from the 2005–06 Cypriot Fourth Division.

Teams promoted from regional leagues
 FC Episkopi
 APEP Pelendriou
 Anagennisi Trachoniou
 Kissos Kissonergas

Teams relegated to regional leagues
 Anagennisi Lythrodonta
 THOI Avgorou
 Apollon Lympion

League standings

Results

See also
 Cypriot Fourth Division
 2005–06 Cypriot First Division
 2005–06 Cypriot Cup

Sources

Cypriot Fourth Division seasons
Cyprus
2005–06 in Cypriot football